Participants in the Great Locomotive Chase, or Andrews's Raid, 1862.

References

United States Army lists
Recipients of United States military awards and decorations
Lists of American military personnel
American Civil War-related lists
Great Locomotive Chase